Apiate (also known as Apeatse) is a mining village situated along the Tarkwa-Bogoso-Ayamfuri road in Ghana. It was a victim of infrastructure destruction and casualties as a result of the 2022 Bogoso explosion.

References 

Villages in Ghana